July 19 - Eastern Orthodox Church calendar - July 21

All fixed commemorations below are celebrated on August 2 by Old Calendar.

For July 20th, Orthodox Churches on the Old Calendar commemorate the Saints listed on July 7.

Saints
 Holy and glorious Prophet Elijah the Thesbite, whose fiery ascent as it were into the Heavens we celebrate (9th century BC)
 Saint Flavianus II of Antioch, Patriarch and Confessor (512)
 Saint Elias I of Jerusalem, Patriarch and Confessor (518)

Pre-Schism Western saints
 Saint Rheticus (Rheticius, Rhetice), a Gallo-Roman who became Bishop of Autun in France (334)
 Saint Aurelius of Carthage, Bishop of Carthage in North Africa (429)
 Saint Severa of St Gemma, Abbess of St Gemma (later Sainte-Sevère) in Villeneuve near Bourges, the sister of St Modoald, Bishop of Trier (c. 680)
 Saint Wulmar of Boulogne (Ulmar, Ulmer, Vilmarus, Volmar), founder of the monastery of Samer near Boulogne, later called Saint-Vulmaire (689)
 Saint Severa of Oehren, Abbess of Oehren near Trier in Germany (c. 750)
 Saint Ansegisus, a monk at Fontenelle Abbey in France at the age of eighteen, he later restored several monasteries (c. 833)
 Hieromartyr Paul the Deacon of Córdoba (851)
 Saint Ethelwida (Ealhswith, Elswith), widow of King Alfred the Great (902)

Post-Schism Orthodox saints
 Martyr Salome of Jerusalem and Kartli, who suffered under the Persians (13th century)
 Saint Abramius of Galich, near Chukhloma Lake, disciple of Saint Sergius of Radonezh (1375)
 Saint Elias (Chavchavadze) the Righteous of Georgia (1907)

New martyrs and confessors
 New Hieromartyr Constantine Slovtsov, Priests (1918)
 New Martyrs Lydia, with soldiers Alexei and Cyril, near Ufa (1928)
 New Hieromartyrs at Voronezh (1930):
 Archimandrite Tikhon (Krechkov);
 Hieromonks George (Pozharov) and Cosmas (Vyaznikov); 
 Priests John Steblin-Kamensky, Sergius Gortinsky, Theodore Yakovlev, Alexander Arkhangelsky, and George Nikitin; 
 Martyrs Euthymius Grebenshchikov and Peter Vyaznikov.
 New Hieromartyr Alexis Znamensky, Priest (1938)
 New Hieromartyr Theodore Abrosimov (1941)
 New Martyrs of Paris:
 Archpriest Alexis Medvedkov, of Ugine, France (1934);
 Elias Fondaminsky (1942);
 Priest Demetrius Klepinine (1944); 
 George Skobtsov (1944); and 
 Nun Maria (Skobtsova) (1945)

Other commemorations
 Icon of the Mother of God "Chukhloma" from Galich (Galich-Chukhlomsk - "Tenderness") (1350)  (see also: May 28, August 15)
 Icon of the Mother of God "Orshansk" (1631)  (see also: September 5)
 Icon of the Mother of God "Abalatsk" ("Sign") (1637)  (see also: November 27)
 Uncovering of the relics (1649) of Hieromartyr Athanasius of Brest-Litovsk, Hegumen of the Monastery of St Simeon Stylites in Brest-Litovsk (1648)
 Repose of Priest Valentine Amphiteatrov of Moscow (1908)
 Repose of Schema-nun Sarah of Borodino (1908)

Icon gallery

Notes

References

Sources
 July 20/August 2. Orthodox Calendar (PRAVOSLAVIE.RU).
 August 2 / July 20. HOLY TRINITY RUSSIAN ORTHODOX CHURCH (A parish of the Patriarchate of Moscow).
 July 20. OCA - The Lives of the Saints.
 July 20. The Year of Our Salvation - Holy Transfiguration Monastery, Brookline, Massachusetts. 
 The Autonomous Orthodox Metropolia of Western Europe and the Americas (ROCOR). St. Hilarion Calendar of Saints for the year of our Lord 2004. St. Hilarion Press (Austin, TX). p. 53.
 The Twentieth Day of the Month of July. Orthodoxy in China.
 July 20. Latin Saints of the Orthodox Patriarchate of Rome.
 The Roman Martyrology. Transl. by the Archbishop of Baltimore. Last Edition, According to the Copy Printed at Rome in 1914. Revised Edition, with the Imprimatur of His Eminence Cardinal Gibbons. Baltimore: John Murphy Company, 1916. pp. 214–215.
 Rev. Richard Stanton. A Menology of England and Wales, or, Brief Memorials of the Ancient British and English Saints Arranged According to the Calendar, Together with the Martyrs of the 16th and 17th Centuries. London: Burns & Oates, 1892. pp. 348–349.

 Greek Sources
 Great Synaxaristes:  20 ΙΟΥΛΙΟΥ. ΜΕΓΑΣ ΣΥΝΑΞΑΡΙΣΤΗΣ.
  Συναξαριστής. 20 Ιουλίου. ECCLESIA.GR. (H ΕΚΚΛΗΣΙΑ ΤΗΣ ΕΛΛΑΔΟΣ). 
  20/07/. Ορθόδοξος Συναξαριστής.

 Russian Sources
  2 августа (20 июля). Православная Энциклопедия под редакцией Патриарха Московского и всея Руси Кирилла (электронная версия). (Orthodox Encyclopedia - Pravenc.ru).
  20 июля по старому стилю / 2 августа по новому стилю. СПЖ "Союз православных журналистов". .
  20 июля (ст.ст.) 2 августа  (нов. ст.). Русская Православная Церковь Отдел внешних церковных связей. (DECR).

July in the Eastern Orthodox calendar